Walter Charles (born April 4, 1945 in East Stroudsburg, Pennsylvania) is an American actor and singer.

Charles made his Broadway debut in Grease in 1972. Additional Broadway credits include 1600 Pennsylvania Avenue (1976), Sweeney Todd (1979), Cats (1982), La Cage aux Folles (1983), Me and My Girl, Aspects of Love (1990), Kiss Me, Kate, The Boys from Syracuse (2002), Big River (2003), The Woman in White (2005), The Apple Tree (2006) and Anything Goes (2011).

Charles' screen credits include A Fine Mess, Fletch Lives, Weeds, and Prancer. On television he has appeared in Cagney and Lacey, Kate and Allie, Law & Order, and Law & Order: Criminal Intent.

References

External links
 
 
 

American male musical theatre actors
American male film actors
American male television actors
Male actors from Pennsylvania
1945 births
Living people